Lavocatia is a genus of extinct mammal from the Lower Cretaceous of Spain. It was a member of the also extinct order Multituberculata, and lived alongside of dinosaurs. Like most Mesozoic mammals, it was a shrewish-sized animal. It's in the suborder "Plagiaulacida" and family Pinheirodontidae. The genus Lavocatia was named by J. I. Canudo and G. Cuenca in 1996 based on a single tooth, with the generic epithet in honor of French paleontologist René Lavocat and the specific epithet a reference to the town of Alfambra.

The species Lavocatia alfambrensis is known from the Barremian-age Camarillas Formation of Galve, Spain. This genus is apparently differentiated by the number of cusps on the tooth; 15. Also referred to in the reference is Peramura. This was a more "advanced" group of mammals, possibly ancestral to ourselves (see Peramus).

References
 Canudo,J. I.; and Cuenca, G. (1996). "Two new mammalian teeth (Multituberculata and Peramura) from the Lower Cretaceous (Barremian) of Spain". Cretaceous Research, 17 (2), p. 215-228.URL visited may, 18, 2011
 Kielan-Jaworowska Z & Hurum JH (2001), "Phylogeny and Systematics of multituberculate mammals". Paleontology 44, p. 389-429.
 Hahn, G., and R. Hahn (1999), "Pinheirodontidae n. fam. (Multituberculata, Mammalia) aus der tiefen Unter-Kreide Portugals". "Palaeontographica", 253(4/6), p. 77-222.

Multituberculates
Cretaceous mammals of Europe
Barremian life
Fossils of Spain
Camarillas Formation
Fossil taxa described in 1996
Prehistoric mammal genera